"Supalonely" is a song by New Zealand singer Benee featuring American singer Gus Dapperton, released through Republic Records on 6 December 2019 as the third and final single from her second extended play Stella & Steve (2019). It also appears on Benee's debut studio album, Hey U X (2020). The song gained immense popularity on the online video-sharing platform TikTok in March 2020, gaining more than 6.9 billion plays for the month. It peaked on the top 40 in over 25 countries including the United Kingdom, the United States, Australia, Canada, France, Germany, The Netherlands and New Zealand, earning a gold certification in its second week in the latter.

The Straits Times also credited the success of "Supalonely" to be owed to those who resonated with the song's themes at the height of the COVID-19 pandemic lockdowns, which were ongoing at the time of the song's popularisation.

Background 
"Supalonely" was written during a month-long trip to Los Angeles. It was inspired by her breaking up with her boyfriend, and was written as a song where she could mock her own sadness. The song "Blu" from Stella & Steve was recorded the day after "Supalonely" during the Los Angeles trip, and was inspired by the same break-up.

Up to three versions of the song exist: the explicit version, the clean version which omits the f-word and replaces the b-word with "chick", and another that completely omits Gus Dapperton's verses and skips straight to the outro after the second chorus.

Composition

The song is composed in the key of G major with a tempo of 129 beats per minute.

Music video 

The song's music video clocked 70 million views in June 2020, four months after its initial release. The song's music video was described as "dreamy" and "colourful" by Billboard. Emily Rose of Ones to Watch dubbed the music video as "a technicolor dream" and wrote that Benee "shows off some killer dance moves while proving that you can still have a great time all on your own." Rose Riddell of Coup de Main simply wrote that the music video features Benee "dancing around a house and chilling in a bathtub" before shouting out the lyric "Now I'm in the bathtub crying." The singer herself said on the video, "It starts with me being a lonely teen at home then turns into this weird dreamscape, where I end up dancing around with Gus."

Critical reception 
On his Apple Music show, Elton John described "Supalonely" as a "smash record", and further described Benee as "an amazing young artist" who "writes really brilliantly". Ariana Marsh from i-D wrote that the "sunny pop" song "turns your typical breakup song on its head". The song was described by Glenn Rowley of Billboard as "a quirky, knowing ode to the art of loneliness". Billboard also ranked "Supalonely" at number 17 on their list of "The 100 Best Songs of 2020".

Commercial performance 
The song was certified Gold on its second week on the New Zealand Top 40, when it rose to number two, from its debut at number three the week before. It peaked in the top 10 of many other countries including Australia, Canada, Norway, Ireland, the Netherlands and Belgium, as well as in the top 40 of countries such as the UK, the US, France, Germany, Sweden, Austria, Finland and Denmark.

Charts

Weekly charts

Year-end charts

Certifications

Release history

Acoustic version 

In May 2020, Benee released an acoustic remix of the song, entitled "Lownely". This "dreamy" version of the song was recorded at Golden Age Studio in Morningside, Auckland on 25 March, a few hours before the national lockdown for the COVID-19 pandemic in New Zealand began.

Charts

Release history

References

2019 singles
2019 songs
Benee songs
Gus Dapperton songs
Republic Records singles
Songs about loneliness
Songs written by Benee
Songs written by Gus Dapperton
Songs written by Jenna Andrews
Songs written by Josh Fountain
Song recordings produced by Josh Fountain